Hoole Village is a village and former civil parish near Chester, in the unitary authority of Cheshire West and Chester and the ceremonial county of Cheshire, England. The civil parish was abolished in 2015 to form Mickle Trafford and District, part of it also went to Guilden Sutton. The parish contained the southern end of the M53 motorway where it becomes the A55 road and is crossed by the A56 road. This junction is known as Hoole Island Junction. Also in the village is Hoole Hall, which is now a hotel.

In 2004 the population was 230, rising to 319 at the time of the 2011 census.

History
In September 1955 a prehistoric arrowhead and a worked flake were found in a garden in the parish. The arrowhead was dated to the period between the Early Bronze Age and the Early Iron Age (2350 BC to 701 BC). In 1995 aerial photography showed evidence of a Roman practice fort near to Hoole Hall. It is believed that the Roman road from Chester to Wilderspool (now part of Warrington) passed through the parish.

Landmarks and places of interest
Hoole Hall was built as a large house around 1720. The hall itself, its attached conservatory built in the mid 19th century, and the ha-ha wall and railings of the west terrace of the house are Grade II listed buildings. The hall is now used as a hotel. Also listed Grade II is a restored pinfold in Oak Lane.

See also

Listed buildings in Hoole Village

References

Notes

Bibliography

Former civil parishes in Cheshire
Cheshire West and Chester